St. Joseph School was a Catholic school in Endicott, New York. 2009 was its final year of operation.

See also
List of Catholic schools in New York

References

Private elementary schools in New York (state)
Schools in Broome County, New York
Private middle schools in New York (state)